The 1949 Campeonato Argentino de Rugby  was won by the selection della Buenos Aires Province, ("Provincia") that beat in the final the selection of Capital.

Rugby Union in Argentina in 1949 
 The France XV visited Argentina playing ad winning nine match, two of them against the Argentina national team.

 The "Championship of Buenos Aires" was shared by Club Atlético San Isidro and Club Universitario de Buenos Aires
 The "Cordoba Province Championship" was won by Jockey Club Córdoba
 The North-East Championship was won by Natación y Gimnasia

Results 
The tournament was played in July, with all the matches played at Club Atlético San Isidro in Buenos Aires, to permit to the selection committee of national team to have an easy look at all the players in order to form the team to play against France in the incoming tour

Notes

Bibliography 
  Memorias de la UAR 1949
  V Campeonato Argentino

Campeonato Argentino de Rugby
Argentina
rugby